Ozone Falls is the name of two waterfalls in the United States:

Ozone Falls and Ozone Falls State Natural Area in Tennessee
One of 24 named waterfalls in Ricketts Glen State Park in Pennsylvania